The Hebrew Reali School of Haifa, located in Haifa, Israel, is one of the country's oldest private schools.

History
The Reali school was established by Arthur Biram on behalf of EZRA, a German Jewish organization, and in close connection with the Technion in 1913, before the outbreak of World War I. The historical building near the old Technion was designed by German-Jewish architect Alexander Baerwald.

The fundamental values of the school are Zionism, humanism, tolerance and democracy. At the time, the Yishuv, or pre-state Jewish community in Palestine, was engaged in a debate over the language of instruction in the country's Jewish schools. When it was decided that the sciences would be taught in German, Biram responded by founding the Hebrew Reali School. The first branch of the school was opened in the Hadar neighborhood of  Haifa. In 1923, the school moved into a building on the old campus of the Technion which had formerly been used as a British military hospital. During that period the school founded a Scouts troop, the 'Carmel Wanderers' (Meshotetei Carmel), and in 1924 the school opened a humanities major, in addition to the previously offered science major. At the very same year the schools motto was determined: "And Walk Humbly" (vehatzna‘ lechet). This motto expresses the school's aspirations in the realm of education.

Between the years 1940-1948, given World War II and the strive towards establishing the country, the students took classes in shifts and the graduates joined the 'service year' (shnat sherut).

In January 2014 Ron Kitrey retired and Dr. Yosi Ben-Dov replaced him as the school's headmaster.

Branches
Today the school has seven branches: 8 kindergartens; 3 elementary schools named after their neighbourhoods: Yesod Hadar; Yesod Ahuza and Yesod Merkaz; 3 middle schools: Tichon Hadar; Tichon Ahuza; Tichon Merkaz; and one high school: Beit Biram. In 1953, a military boarding school was established in proximity to Beit Biram.

In September 2008, the school opened its latest branch, the "Reali-gan" (kindergarten). The kindergarten advocates ecological education: Recycle, Energy saving and Nature protection.

In 2017 the military boarding school (HaPnimiya haTzva’it leFikud) became an integrated part of the school..

Notable alumni

References

High schools in Israel
1913 establishments in the Ottoman Empire
Educational institutions established in 1913
Buildings and structures in Haifa
Jews and Judaism in Haifa